Peter Niers (or Niersch) (c. 1540 – 16 September 1581) was a German serial killer and bandit who was executed on 16 September 1581 in Neumarkt in der Oberpfalz, some 40 km from Nuremberg. Based on confessions extracted from him and his accomplices under torture, he was convicted of 544 murders, including 24 fetuses cut out of pregnant women—allegedly, the fetal remains were to be used in magical rituals (he was believed to be an extremely powerful black magician, with many supernatural abilities) and for acts of cannibalism.

Information about Niers is based on contemporary ballads, "true crime" reports, and official warrants circulating, as well as the aforementioned confessions extracted under torture.

It is unknown whether he actually did kill 544 people, or whether this was just a confession under torture.

Modus operandi
Peter Niers was one of the leading figures in a loosely knit network of robber-killers roaming the countrysides, a network constantly changing in its composition—sometimes joining together for major raids, at other times splitting up into smaller groups to pursue robberies and killings on smaller scale over different areas. Historian Joy Wiltenburg writes:

This way of operating does not seem to have originated with the gang led by Niers and Sumer; apparently, Niers had a mentor in crime called Martin Stier, who from the 1550s until his arrest and execution in 1572 had led a gang of 49 bandits ostensibly working as shepherds, murdering and robbing their way from the Netherlands to Württemberg. Wiltenburg adds that, "Shepherds were widely regarded as dishonourable, especially in the thinking of urban guilds." She proffers an example of such thinking from a novel published in 1554, where the young antihero gradually slides down the social scale to that of a herdsman, and finally hits the bottom as a wandering minstrel. "Far from civilized society and alone with the animals, he has time to think over his misdeeds. Members of such a group were unsurprising suspects".

Throughout his career as a murderer (said to have spanned some 15 years according to a folk song), Niers was finally found guilty of having murdered 544 individuals, including 24 pregnant women and the fetuses Niers had cut out of their wombs for acts of cannibalism and to use in rituals of magic.

First arrest and escape
In 1577, some of the gang members were caught, including Niers himself. Monika Spicker-Beck, for example, notes that a Claus Strikker confessed in April that 10 years earlier, he had worked together with Niers, and helped him murder a 20-year-old woman in Gottswald. Also, an accomplice named Peter Oblath drew up a list of 14 gang members, including the name of Peter Niers. Joy Wiltenburg notes that Niers himself was arrested and tortured in Gersbach. There, he confessed to 75 acts of murder, but somehow managed to escape. Over the next few years, until his final arrest in 1581, a number of pamphlets, ballads, and stories were written and circulated detailing his cannibalism and mastery of the black arts. For example, it was said that when Niers and Sumer's gang gathered at Pfalzburg, they had a meeting with the Devil, who gave his blessing to the gang's ambitions, even providing Niers and Sumer with monthly pay along with granting supernatural powers to Niers. Even earlier than this, however, it seems that Niers learned how to become invisible from his mentor Martin Stier, and that the only reason he was finally caught was because he was deprived of his bag containing the magical materials to make himself invisible. A critical component of such magical material was thought to be the remains of fetuses; during the casting of the spell the fetus hearts were eaten. Joy Wiltenburg mentions also another use of fetal black magic: To concoct the flesh and fats of infants into magic candles that, when lit, would allow them to rob houses without awaking the inhabitants.

Peter Niers was credited with other supernatural powers as well, in particular the ability of physical transformation; various stories attributed him with the ability to change his shape into that of a log or a stone, but according to a late ballad, he could also become a goat, dog, or cat at will.

A contemporary account, however, suggests more mundanely that Peter Niers was a master of disguise: In a circulated warrant from 1579, based on confessions from his captured underlings, when Niers was thought to operate in the Schwarzwald area, it is stated that he frequently changed his appearance and costume, sometimes masquerading as a common soldier, at other times as a leper, and adopted other disguises. The same warrant states, however, that some things stayed constant: He always had much money in his possession, he carried two loaded pistols in his trousers, and carried a huge two-handed sword.

The folk song mentioned above has a few particulars on his physical appearance; he was described as "rather old," two of his fingers were crooked, and he had a long scar on his chin.

Final arrest, torture and execution
A late ballad contains the circumstances under which Niers was discovered, leading to his arrest and execution. He arrived at Neumarkt, and lodged in an inn called "The Bells". A couple of days later, he felt a desire to wash himself, and went to a public bath house, leaving behind his precious bag with magical materials to be kept safe by the inn-keeper. At this time, Peter Niers had achieved notoriety, and his physical appearance had circulated in warrants and pamphlets. One of those at the bath house, a cooper, recognized him, and gradually a mumbling and whispering spread among the bath house guests that the stranger might, indeed, be the wanted arch-killer. Peter Niers himself was oblivious to the changing mood, and two citizens slipped out of the bath house and went to the inn. There, on request, the inn keeper gave them Niers's bag, they opened it, and it contained several severed hands and hearts from murdered fetuses. The townspeople reacted quickly, and a force of eight men was gathered that apprehended Peter Niers. When he understood they had found out what he carried in his sack, he admitted to his identity, and that he was guilty, and confessed to his many murders.

Peter Niers was tortured and executed over the course of three days in September 1581. On the first day, strips of flesh were torn from his body and heated oil was poured into his wounds.  On the second day, his feet were smeared with heated oil and then held above glowing coal, thereby roasting him. On the third day, 16 September 1581, he was dragged to the place of execution and broken on the wheel; the wheel was slammed down upon him 42 times. Still alive, he was finally dismembered by quartering.

See also
 Christman Genipperteinga was a legendary bandit reputedly executed in 1581 for having killed 964 individuals.
 List of serial killers before 1900
 List of German serial killers

References

Bibliography

Notes

External links 
Purification through pain translated article by Frank Thadeusz published October 28, 2010 in Der Spiegel on motivations behind "gruesome" executions like that of Peter Niers.

1581 deaths
16th-century executions in the Holy Roman Empire
16th-century German people
Crimes involving Satanism or the occult
Executed German serial killers
German cannibals
Male serial killers
People executed by breaking wheel
People executed by dismemberment
Place of birth missing
Place of death missing
Year of birth unknown
German Protestants